Sandown Park Railway Station can refer to:

The railway station in Melbourne, Australia: Sandown Park railway station, Melbourne
The railway station in Sydney, Australia: Sandown railway station, Sydney

Esher railway station is adjacent to Sandown Park racecourse in England.